This is the list of cathedrals in South Korea sorted by denomination.

Roman Catholic
Cathedrals of the Roman Catholic Church in South Korea:
 Mokseong-dong Cathedral in Andong
 Naedeokdong Cathedral in Cheongju
 Chuncheon Juklim-dong Cathedral in Chuncheon
 Kyesan Cathedral and Beomeo Cathedral in Daegu
 Daeheungdong Cathedral in Daejeon
 Dapdong Cathedral in Inchon
 Joong-Ang Cathedral in Jeju City
 Jeondong Cathedral in Jeonju
 Im-dong Cathedral in Kwangju
 Yangdeokdong Cathedral in Masan
 Namcheon Cathedral in Pusan
 Cathedral of Virgin Mary of the Immaculate Conception (Myeong-dong Cathedral) in Seoul
 Jeongjadong Cathedral and Jowondong Cathedral in Suwon
 Cathedral of the Sacred Heart of Mary in Uijongbu
 Wondong Cathedral in Wonju

Eastern Orthodox
Eastern Orthodox cathedral in South Korea:
 St. Nicholas Cathedral in Seoul

Anglican
Cathedrals of the Anglican Church of Korea:
 Sts. Mary and Nicholas's Cathedral (Seoul Cathedral) in Seoul
 St. Benedict's Anglican Cathedral in Taejon 
 Our Savior's Cathedral in Pusan

See also

List of cathedrals
Christianity in Korea

References

Cathedrals in South Korea
South Korea
Cathedrals
Cathedrals